Eulima lapazana is a species of small, ectoparasitic sea snail, a marine gastropod mollusk in the family Eulimidae. The species is one of a number within the genus Eulima.

References

lapazana
Gastropods described in 1917